Nadeem Malik is a Pakistani journalist. He is president of the news channel Samaa TV, and hosts the current affairs programme Nadeem Malik Live. He is also Senior Executive Vice President of Hum News. He was formerly director of programmes at AAJ TV, and hosted the daily talkshow Islamabad Tonight.

On August 14, 2022 he was nominated for the Sitara-i-Imtiaz, one of the highest civil awards,  which was presented by the President of Pakistan.

Early life and family
Nadeem Malik was born to a Kakazai family in Sheikhupura on 13 April 1968.

Career
Malik served as the Bureau Chief of Islamabad for CNBC Pakistan, and hosted the talk show News Guru. He has worked for local and international news journals as a freelancer, including for BBC Online, Asia Times, and The News International.

As a host, he has conducted discussion programs featuring politicians, economists and other professionals. He covered the 2002, 2008 and 2013 Pakistani general elections, the Parliamentary sessions for elections of the Prime Minister of Pakistan, and Speakers of the National Assembly of Pakistan. He was an analyst and commentator for current affairs programs for international TV and radio channels, before joining CNBC Pakistan in 2005.

He was the host for programmes on PTV News, Current Affairs Channel, and Radio Pakistan before the advent of private news channels in the country. He hosted News Morning and News Night for PTV.

He interviewed national and international leaders, including American Secretary of State Hillary Clinton, Sri Lankan President Chandrika Kumaratunga, Malaysian Prime Minister Abdullah Ahmad Badawi, and Afghan President Hamid Karzai, and has interviewed almost every Pakistani President and Prime Minister since 1990.

See also
 Samaa TV
List of Pakistani journalists
 Hum News

References

External links
 Nadeem Malik Live
 Islamabad Tonight Profile on AAJ TV
 References from the Book of John W Garver China and Iran: Ancient Partners in a Post-Imperial World
 New Dawn for South Asia Trade Asia Times

Living people
Pakistani male journalists
1968 births
People from Sheikhupura
Punjabi people